Niagara Frontier Transit Buildings, also known as the Buffalo East Side Railway Co. Horse and Car Barn, was a set of historic transit-related buildings located at Buffalo, Erie County, New York.  They were built between about 1881 and 1883, and consisted of two interconnected Italianate style brick buildings.  They were built by the Buffalo East Side Railway Company to stable its horse and horse-drawn streetcars.   It later housed electric trolleys of the International Railway Company and buses of the Niagara Frontier Transportation Authority. The buildings have been demolished.

It was listed on the National Register of Historic Places in 1980 and delisted in 1981.

References

Railway buildings and structures on the National Register of Historic Places in New York (state)
Buildings and structures completed in 1883
Buildings and structures in Buffalo, New York
Demolished buildings and structures in New York (state)
Former National Register of Historic Places in New York (state)
National Register of Historic Places in Buffalo, New York